The Reformed Church is a church in Nuşfalău, Romania, built in the 15th century.

It is listed as a historic monument.

References

External links
 Nuşfalău, Reformed church

15th-century churches in Romania
Reformed churches in Romania
Historic monuments in Sălaj County
Churches in Sălaj County